Nalameryx is an extinct genus of lophiomerycid ruminant which existed in lower Chitarwata Formation, Pakistan during the middle Oligocene. It was first named by Grégoire Métais, Jean-Loup Welcomme and Stéphane Ducrocq in 2009 and the type species is Nalameryx savagei.
Nalameryx savagei is one of the rare mammals found during the Oligocene. Five dental remains 
composed the originally found material, described in 1990. The first phylogenetic hypothesis proposed 
Nalameryx to be closely related to the basal ruminant Lophiomerycidae. The description of new specimens 
from the type bed K/7b from the Kargil Formation (late Oligocene, India), led to a reinterpretation of the 
phylogenetic position of Nalameryx and of the early evolutionary history of the Tragulidae. Based on the 
phylogenetic hypothesis, Nalameryx is nested within the living Tragulidae, making it one of the oldest known 
tragulid.

References

Oligocene even-toed ungulates
Fossil taxa described in 2009
Oligocene mammals of Asia
Prehistoric even-toed ungulate genera